The Tacnazo was a military coup launched by then Peruvian Prime Minister, General Francisco Morales Bermúdez against the administration of President Gen. Juan Velasco Alvarado in 1975. This led to what is known in Peru as the "Second Phase" of the Revolutionary Government of the Armed Forces, which lasted until the elections of 1980.

Background

On February 5, 1975, there was a police strike and an attempted coup that turned into riots and looting in the historic center of Lima, which were then violently suppressed by the Peruvian Army. This event continued to destabilize the Velasco administration, already unstable after growing discontent and demands for economic reform from the public.

On the morning of Thursday, August 28, 1975, the annual ceremony commemorating the return of the Province of Tacna to Peru took place, with the presence of then Prime Minister Francisco Morales Bermúdez and the heads of the military and without the presence of President Juan Velasco Alvarado, who was in Lima.

Coup
The coup was planned at the Tarapacá barracks as a military uprising in the southern city of Tacna, and was supported unanimously by several of the most prominent members of the Armed Forces. The next day, at 2:00 am, neighboring Chilean radios received the news regarding the coup.

After an improvised speech in the main square of Tacna, General Morales Bermúdez urged President Velasco to leave office peacefully and avoid a direct confrontation. President Velasco, already having come down with illness, resigned after realising that little could be done to resist. He died in 1977.

Aftermath 
The Morales Bermúdez administration proved unable to continue with the original leftist military government program. President Morales Bermúdez did not continue with what was supposed to be the "Revolution", but his own program, which was supposed to mitigate the pseudo-Communist experiments of Velasco's administration. A purge in the Army saw most of Velasco's supporters forced to resign or leave their commissions.

He was forced to call a Constitutional Assembly (which was led by Víctor Raúl Haya de la Torre) and new elections.

See also
 1968 Peruvian coup d'état

References 

1970s coups d'état and coup attempts
1975 in Peru
Conflicts in 1975
August 1975 events in South America
Military history of Peru
Political history of Peru
1975 in politics
Military coups in Peru
Revolutionary Government of the Armed Forces of Peru